Yogurting ( Yogureuting) was an MMORPG (Massively Multiplayer Online Role Playing Game) developed by NTIX Soft in South Korea and released as open-beta on May 10, 2005, and was also released in Japan on November 24, 2005.

Yogurting was an online RPG of modern school life.  It took place in "Estiva Academy" and "So-weol Academy" and solves the mystery of Endless Vacation Phenomenon.  This is an event that spanned the whole game, causing all teachers and schools to disappear, hence the name "endless vacation".

A promotional video released in June 2005 entitled "Always", featuring Koyote member Shin Ji.

Shu Shibato, Sayaka Gojo produced webcomics based on the video game.

Scott Sharkey from 1UP.com awarded Yogurting for #2 in "Worst Games, Best Names" category.

This game is no longer in service. The Japanese server shut down in May, 2010. In Thailand, servers shut down on March 29, 2011.

A related mobile puzzle game titled Yogurting Pop was first released in November 2014.

Notes

External links 
Yogurting Website (in Japanese)
Yogurting Website (in Thai)
Official Announcement of Japanese Server Shutdown (in Japanese)
SignIn Webcomic based on Yogurting 
Yogurting Community in Thailand (in Thai)

2005 video games
Massively multiplayer online role-playing games
Video games developed in South Korea
Windows games
Windows-only games
Video games with cel-shaded animation
2011 disestablishments in South Korea
Inactive massively multiplayer online games
Products and services discontinued in 2011
Works about vacationing